Casper: A Spirited Beginning is a 1997 American direct-to-video fantasy comedy film based on the Harvey Comics cartoon character Casper the Friendly Ghost. It serves as a prequel to the 1995 Universal/Amblin film Casper. The plot explores additional details surrounding the titular character's origins. The film was produced by The Harvey Entertainment Company and Saban Entertainment and released by 20th Century Fox Home Entertainment on September 9, 1997, and was met with widespread criticism from critics. 20th Century Fox had previously acquired film rights to the character from Universal. The original VHS release included the US version of the music video for 911's "Love Sensation" as a special feature, though it has been omitted from the subsequent DVD releases. The soundtrack album was released on CD and cassette on October 24, 1997.

Plot
In a ghost train where spirits are heading towards the Ghost Central, Casper is unaware of where he is, while also unaware that he is a ghost himself. He gets kicked off the train and finds himself in the city of Deedstown, where he unintentionally scares a bunch of the town's citizens, which leads him to the realization that he is in fact a ghost.

Meanwhile, a loner boy named Chris Carson, with a passionate obsession of the supernatural, has a strained relationship with his work-obsessed father Tim Carson, who is attempting to demolish the Applegate Mansion, to make way for a new renovation for the town: building a brand new mini-mall in its place. However, a group of protestors are against the demolition, as the house is considered a historical landmark. The protest is cut short when the wrecking crew that Tim hired and protestors are terrorized by the Ghostly Trio, Stretch, Fatso and Stinkie, who are in possession of the Mansion. Chris witnesses this after seeing the group running in panic, and wants to join the Trio, but they refuse since he is only human.

The train that Casper was on arrives in Ghost Central run by the evil ghoul Kibosh, where new spirits are trained to learn the proper ghost lifestyle and work to receive a haunting license. After discovering Casper's absent, Kibosh becomes furious about the idea of letting a rookie ghost being let loose without any education and forces his spineless assistant Snivel to find Casper and bring him back.

Back at Deedstown, Chris's teacher, Sheila Fistergraff, who leads the protesters, witnesses in the news that Tim and Mayor Johnny Hunt will proceed with the demolition project as planned, despite the setbacks, after the mayor threatens to dismiss Tim if he fails. 
 
Chris runs into Casper, and instantly befriends him, much to Casper's surprise due to seeing that a human is not afraid of him. Chris insists on teaching Casper to be a real ghost while also introducing him to the Trio. Much to the Trio's delight, they discover that Casper has not gone to the Ghost Central and has therefore never been educated by Kibosh, which gives them the opportunity to train Casper and prove themselves to Kibosh, so he would stop pursuing them. However, they are unknowingly eavesdropped on by Snivel, who informs Kibosh of their plan, much to Kibosh's rage. Casper manages to succeed in his first lesson in going into the stealth mode (going invisible), but fails at every other lesson, leading the Trio to realize that Casper is too soft to be a terrifying ghost: he wants to be friendly, which forces them to kick him out.

After a night of waiting for his father's arrival at his school's open house, Chris gets disappointed that he never showed up as Fistergraff tries to comfort and support Chris. The next morning, Tim decides to make it up to him by spending more time with him that night. Chris offers to teach Casper to become a better ghost after Casper informed him on what happened. Casper manages to succeed by using his powers on a bully named Brock getting him into trouble with the principal, and so he tests his new powers by using them to help people.

Tim is unable to attend a parent-teacher conference he and Chris planned earlier, but Chris hopes his father will remember their other plans, and with Casper's help, sets up dinner for Tim's arrival, Snivel sees Casper acting like a servant to a human and leaves to report back to Kibosh, to which Kibosh prepares to retrieve Casper himself. The Ghostly Trio discover Casper's good deeds and abduct him in attempt to save their reputation, which unfortunately ruins Chris' opportunity to have Tim meet Casper as Tim does not believe Chris, and instead leaves to visit the mayor. Chris runs away, feeling betrayed by Casper, but gets captured and locked inside the mansion by Brock and his gang out of retaliation, unaware that a bomb has been planted inside by Bill Case, a professional bomber hired by Tim to blow up the mansion.

The next morning, Kibosh arrives in Deedstown, captures the Ghostly Trio, and sends Snivel to find Casper, who fled the Trio the night before. After discovering that Chris ran away, Tim meets Casper, and they both set out to find him, with Casper assuming that he is in the Applegate Mansion, which is about to explode, so Tim hitches a ride with Fistergraff as Casper arrives at the mansion to find Chris, and try to help him escape. Tim manages to get Chris out and Casper eats the bomb, which explodes in his stomach, saving the mansion.

With Kibosh being impressed with Casper's technique, Casper informs him that the Ghostly Trio taught him how to do it, so Kibosh decides to let Trio stay and haunt, which led to the Trio returning Casper the favor by lying to Kibosh saying that they are Casper's uncles, after Kibosh informs them the importance of family, which allows Casper to stay with his "uncles" and Kibosh to leave them in peace. Chris and his father reconcile and Brock and his gang get their comeuppance when the Trio hangs them from the branches of a nearby tree by their underwear. Casper decides to go with a new name; Casper the Friendly Ghost.

Cast

Live-action cast
Brendon Ryan Barrett as Chris Carson
Steve Guttenberg as Tim Carson
Lori Loughlin as Sheila Fistergraff
Shannon Chandler as Jennifer
Rodney Dangerfield as Mayor Johnny Hunt
Michael McKean as Bill Case
Richard Moll as Principal Rabie
Steven Hartman as Brock Lee
Logan Robbins as Danny
D'Juan Watts as Leon
Sherman Hemsley as Store Owner
Ben Stein as Grocer
Brian Doyle-Murray as Foreman Dave
Edie McClurg as Librarian
Rodger Halston as Stan
Casper Van Dien as Bystander
Michael James McDonald as Sarcastic Protester

Voice cast
Jeremy Foley as Casper
James Ward as Stretch
Jess Harnell as Fatso
Bill Farmer as Stinkie
James Earl Jones as Kibosh
Pauly Shore as Snivel

Production
While Universal Studios planned their own sequel to 1995 film Casper for a tentative 1999 release, Harvey Entertainment who owned the rights to the IP shopped the property around looking for other studios interested in producing projects based on the character. Harvey eventually set up production of a direct-to-video prequel film with 20th Century Fox Home Entertainment. After finishing work on 3 Ninjas: High Noon at Mega Mountain, director Sean McNamara approached producer Mike Elliott about the directing job and after showing Elliott 3 Ninjas, McNamara was hired.

Critical reception
Casper: A Spirited Beginning received an extremely negative reaction from film critics. Based on 5 reviews on review aggregator Rotten Tomatoes, 0% of critics gave the film a positive review, with an average rating of 2.2/10.

Soundtrack
A soundtrack album, containing songs from the film, was released on CD and cassette by EMI-Capitol.

Home media
Casper: A Spirited Beginning was released on VHS in 1997, by 20th Century Fox Home Entertainment. It was re-released on DVD in 2005, by Classic Media and Sony Wonder, and has been re-released in 2021, by Universal Pictures Home Entertainment.

See also

List of ghost films

References

External links

1997 films
1997 direct-to-video films
1990s American animated films
1990s fantasy comedy films
1990s ghost films
20th Century Fox direct-to-video films
American children's fantasy films
American films with live action and animation
American fantasy comedy films
American ghost films
American direct-to-video films
Brookwell McNamara Entertainment films
Casper the Friendly Ghost films
Casper the Friendly Ghost
Direct-to-video comedy films
Direct-to-video prequel films
Films directed by Sean McNamara
Films produced by Mike Elliott
Films scored by Inon Zur
Films set in country houses
Live-action films based on animated series
Films based on American comics
Films based on Harvey Comics
Live-action films based on comics
Saban Entertainment films
Films with screenplays by Jymn Magon
1997 comedy films
1997 fantasy films
1990s English-language films
Films about father–son relationships
American prequel films